Belomorsky District is an administrative district (raion), one of the fifteen in the Republic of Karelia, Russia. It is located in the east of the republic. Its administrative center is the town of Belomorsk. As of the 2010 Census, the total population of the district was 19,118, with the population of Belomorsk accounting for 58.7% of that number.

Administrative and municipal status
Within the framework of administrative divisions, Belomorsky District is one of the fifteen in the Republic of Karelia and has administrative jurisdiction over one town (Belomorsk) and fifty-six rural localities. As a municipal division, the district is incorporated as Belomorsky Municipal District. The town of Belomorsk and eleven rural localities are incorporated into an urban settlement, while the remaining forty-five rural localities are incorporated into three rural settlements within the municipal district. The town of Belomorsk serves as the administrative center of both the administrative and municipal district.

References

Notes

Sources

Districts of the Republic of Karelia
 
